Enrico Garozzo (born 21 June 1989 in Catania, Sicily) is an Italian right-handed épée fencer and 2016 Olympic silver medalist.

Garozzo is an athlete of the Centro Sportivo Carabinieri.

Biography
Garozzo won a silver medal at the 2006 Cadets World Fencing Championship in Taebaek, then took the gold at the 2008 Junior World Fencing Championship in his childhood city Acireale.

Amongst seniors, he made his first Fencing World Cup podium in 2010 with a third place in the Grand Prix de Berne. This was followed in the 2011–12 season by a second place at the Jockey Club Argentino.

In the 2012–13 season he placed third in the Heidenheimer Pokal and in the 2013 Mediterranean Games at Mersin. He advanced to the quarter-finals in the 2013 European Championships at Budapest before being stopped by eventual silver medallist Daniel Jerent. In the 2013–14 season, he won a silver medal in the Doha Grand Prix and took a bronze medal at the World Championships in Kazan after losing in the semifinals to South Korea's Park Kyoung-doo. He finished the season 4th in world rankings, a career best.

In the 2014–15 season Garozzo won a bronze medal in the Doha Grand Prix.

Enrico's younger brother, Daniele, is a foil fencer.
He lives in Milan with Estonian fencer Erika Kirpu.

Medal Record

Olympic Games

World Championship

European Championship

Grand Prix

World Cup

References

External links

  (archive)
 
 
 
 

Italian male épée fencers
Living people
1989 births
Sportspeople from the Province of Catania
People from Acireale
Olympic fencers of Italy
Fencers at the 2016 Summer Olympics
Olympic silver medalists for Italy
Olympic medalists in fencing
Medalists at the 2016 Summer Olympics
Universiade medalists in fencing
Mediterranean Games bronze medalists for Italy
Mediterranean Games medalists in fencing
Competitors at the 2013 Mediterranean Games
Universiade silver medalists for Italy
Fencers of Centro Sportivo Carabinieri
Medalists at the 2009 Summer Universiade
Fencers at the 2020 Summer Olympics